Michael Bonin (born March 19, 1967) is an American politician, who served as a member of the Los Angeles City Council for the 11th district from 2013 to 2022. A progressive member of the Democratic Party, he was previously a reporter and a council staffer.

Early life 
Bonin graduated from Clinton High School in Clinton, Massachusetts, in 1985. His grandfather William P. Constantino was a state representative and a judge in the town of Clinton. His uncle William P. Constantino Jr. also served as a state representative. Bonin graduated from Harvard University. He had a sister, Maureen, who died of cancer in 2010.

Career

From 1989 to 1996 Bonin worked as a reporter at Springfield Newspapers in Springfield, Massachusetts, and Wave Newspapers in Los Angeles.

Political career
Bonin began his political career in Los Angeles city politics in 1996, joining the staff of L.A. City Councilmember Ruth Galanter. During his seven years with Galanter he worked as a legislative deputy, district director, and deputy chief of staff. From 2003 to 2004 Bonin worked in the Office of Congresswoman Jane Harman as deputy chief of staff and district director. In 2005 Bonin managed Bill Rosendahl's successful campaign for L.A. city council. Rosendahl subsequently appointed Bonin as his chief of staff.

During the summer of 2012, Rosendahl announced he had been diagnosed with cancer, and in October announced he would not seek reelection. He endorsed Bonin. Bonin won the subsequent election with 61% of the vote. Bonin was re-elected on March 7, 2017, defeating Mark Ryavec and Robin Rudisill. Bonin won with 71% of votes cast supporting him.

Tenure 

Bonin was appointed Chair of the City Council's Transportation Committee, and serves as a member of the Los Angeles County Metropolitan Transportation Authority Board of Directors

On February 18, 2014, Bonin and his colleagues Nury Martinez and Curren Price introduced legislation to establish a living wage of $15.37 per hour for employees at large hotels in Los Angeles. The bill was approved by the Council by a 12-3 vote, setting one of the highest minimum wages in the country.

In the fall of 2014, Bonin was one of four co-authors of legislation that would raise the minimum wage in Los Angeles. While supportive of Mayor Eric Garcetti's initial proposal to incrementally increase the minimum wage to $13.25 per hour by 2017, Bonin called for extending the proposed increase to reach $15.25 by 2019.

On September 4, 2013, Bonin and his colleague Paul Koretz introduced the Los Angeles Fracking Moratorium to the City Council. The motion, which instructed the City Attorney to draft an ordinance that would temporarily ban "unconventional oil and gas drilling" techniques like fracking in Los Angeles until they can be proven safe, was approved by the City Council on February 28, 2014. Bonin also co-authored legislation that would create a research collaborative with the mission of charting an achievable path to 100% clean energy in Los Angeles.

In 2018, Bonin supported the construction of a Bridge Home facility in a residential area of Venice. Amid resistance from residents, the facility was constructed at a cost of $8.5 million dollars. It provides 100 beds for homeless adults and 54 beds for transitional age youth.

In May 2021, Bonin sponsored a motion to study situating temporary homeless housing in parking lots near Will Rogers State Beach. This prompted criticism by some residents.

A campaign for a recall election to remove Councilman Bonin from office was launched on September 15, 2017. The recall campaign failed to receive support from the required five individuals and was abandoned before it ever formally began.

A second recall campaign was launched in 2021. In November 2021, the group sponsoring the recall claimed that it had submitted sufficient signatures to trigger a recall election. On January 18, 2022, the Los Angeles City Clerk announced that although the recall group received 25,965 valid signatures, it fell 1,350 short of the number needed to trigger a recall election.

On January 26, 2022, Bonin announced that he would not seek reelection for a third term, citing depression and health issues. On October 9, 2022, leaked audio came out that records fellow council members Nury Martinez and Kevin de León making racist remarks about Bonin and his son.

Awards
In 2014, Bonin was voted "Best Local Public Servant (elected)" in The Argonaut's annual "Best of the Westside" reader poll. He went on to win the award in 2015 and 2016 as well - all three years that he has been eligible to receive it.

In 2016, Bonin accepted the first "Bill Rosendahl Community Champion Award" at the Sierra Club's Political Leadership Awards, and has also been honored for his work on improving bike and pedestrian safety in neighborhoods throughout the city.

Personal life
Bonin lives in Mar Vista with his husband, Sean Arian, whom he married in 2014. Mayor Eric Garcetti performed the wedding ceremony. Arian is founder and President of EOS Consulting and also serves as the Founder and Chief Strategist for Bixel Exchange, a technology startup incubator created by the Los Angeles Area Chamber of Commerce and Small Business Development Center.  The couple has an adopted son who is Black. Bonin is Catholic, a member of St. Monica Catholic Church in Santa Monica.

References

External links
Los Angeles Council District 11
Bonin for LA City Council - Campaign Website

Living people
Harvard University alumni
Greater Los Angeles Democratic Party politicians
Los Angeles City Council members
People from Clinton, Massachusetts
1967 births
American LGBT city council members
LGBT people from California
LGBT people from Massachusetts
21st-century American politicians
Activists from California
Gay politicians